FIFA, through several companies, sold the broadcasting rights for the 2018 FIFA World Cup to the following broadcasters.

Television

Radio

References 

Broadcasting rights
FIFA World Cup broadcasting rights